Blacklist (Blacklist – ;  Secret Student Blacklist) is a 2019 Thai television series starring Korapat Kirdpan (Nanon), Wachirawit Ruangwiwat (Chimon), Pawat Chittsawangdee (Ohm), Sattabut Laedeke (Drake), Kanaphan Puitrakul (First), Thanatsaran Samthonglai (Frank) and Preeti Barameeanant (Bank).

Directed by Worrawech Danuwong and produced by GMMTV together with Lasercat Studio, the series was one of the thirteen television series for 2019 launched by GMMTV in their "Wonder Th13teen" event on 5 November 2018. It premiered on GMM 25 and LINE TV on 13 October 2019, airing on Sundays at 21:25 ICT and 23:00 ICT, respectively. The series concluded on 29 December 2019.

Synopsis 
Akeanan is a school not just well-known on education and sports but also of secrets. The mystery surrounding the disappearance of Fah (Ploy Sornarin), a student of the school, prompts her brother Traffic (Korapat Kirdpan) to come to Akeanan. He finds himself in Room 4/6 where he meets school outsiders namely Andrew (Wachirawit Ruangwiwat), Highlight (Pawat Chittsawangdee), Title (Sattabut Laedeke), Jim Bae (Kanaphan Puitrakul) and Bantad (Thanatsaran Samthonglai) — all members of a secret group called "Blacklist" whose purpose is to investigate the mysterious happenings in their school. Traffic later on gets invited by their school teacher to join the said group.

Aside from finding out what happened to Fah, "Blacklist" will also uncover the several deep dark secrets of Akeanan.

Cast and characters 
Below are the cast of the series:

Main 
 Korapat Kirdpan (Nanon) as Traffic 
 Wachirawit Ruangwiwat (Chimon) as Andrew
 Pawat Chittsawangdee (Ohm) as Highlight
 Sattabut Laedeke (Drake) as Title
 Kanaphan Puitrakul (First) as Jim Bae
 Thanatsaran Samthonglai (Frank) as Bantad 
 Preeti Barameeanant (Bank) as Mr. Wanpadej

Supporting 
 Chanikarn Tangabodi (Prim) as Melon
 Pattranite Limpatiyakorn (Love) as Phukkad
 Benyapa Jeenprasom (View) as Carrot
 Sureeyaret Yakaret (Prigkhing) as Orange
 Phatchatorn Tanawat (Ployphat) as Cupcake
 Kanyarat Ruangrung (Piploy) as Laila
 Napassakorn Midaim as Principal Karin
 Wichayanee Pearklin (Gam) as Ms. Jinmanee
 Pahun Jiyacharoen (Marc) as Viking
 Jirakit Kuariyakul (Toptap) as Dark
 Pumipat Paiboon (Prame) as Champ
 Thanawat Rattanakitpaisarn (Khaotung) as Joe
 Praeploy Oree as Pim
 Chayakorn Jutamat (JJ) as Bacon

Guest role 
 Natouch Siripongthon (Fluke) as Nattee
 Juthapich Inn-Chan (Jamie) as Kiwi
 Phollawat Manuprasert (Tom) as Jim Bae's father
 Chinnapat Kittichaiwarangkul (Flute) as Jerd
 Ploy Sornarin as Fah, Traffic's sister
 Papangkorn Lerkchaleampote (Beam) as Young Wanpadej
 Tytan Teepprasan as Pai
 Krittanai Arsalprakit (Nammon) as Manas

Soundtrack

References

External links 
 Blacklist on GMM 25 website 
 Blacklist on LINE TV
 
 GMMTV

Television series by GMMTV
Thai action television series
Thai drama television series
2019 Thai television series debuts
2019 Thai television series endings
GMM 25 original programming
Television series by Lasercat